Venad may refer to:

 Venad (historical region) - historical region/kingdom in Kerala-Tamil Nadu
 Venadu (Nellore, Andhra Pradesh)